Reinhard Glemnitz (born 27 November 1930 in Breslau, Germany (now Wrocław, Poland) is a German television actor.

Selected filmography
 08/15 (1954)
 Love's Carnival (1955)
 My Schoolfriend (1960)
 Mission to Hell (1964)
 Condemned to Sin (1964)
  (1965, TV miniseries)
  (1967, TV miniseries)
 Der Kommissar (1969–1976, TV series)
  (1978, TV miniseries)
 Bloodline (1979)
 Der Millionenbauer (1979–1988, TV series)
  (1983, TV film)
 The Wannsee Conference (1984, TV film)
 Patrik Pacard (1984–1985, TV miniseries)
 A Crime of Honour ( A Song for Europe, 1985, TV film)
 Anna Maria – Eine Frau geht ihren Weg (1994–1995, TV series)

External links

ZBF Agency Munich 

1930 births
Living people
German male television actors
20th-century German male actors
Actors from Wrocław
People from the Province of Lower Silesia
German male film actors